Kallinag-e Hasankhani (also Romanized as Kallīnag-e Ḩasankhānī; also known as Kallīnak-e Ḩasankhānī) is a village in Howmeh Rural District, in the Central District of Iranshahr County, Sistan and Baluchestan Province, Iran. At the 2006 census, its population was 1,930, in 334 families.

References 

Populated places in Iranshahr County